Domenico Pinelli, seniore (1541–1611) was a Roman Catholic cardinal.

Episcopal succession

References

1541 births
1611 deaths
17th-century Italian cardinals
16th-century Italian Roman Catholic bishops